The 2010–11 Primera División season was the 120th season of top-flight professional football in Argentina. A total of 20 teams competed in two championships —the Apertura and Clausura— over the course of the season, which started on August 6, 2010 and ended on June 30, 2011, one day prior to the start of the 2011 Copa América, held in Argentina.

Club information
Twenty clubs participated in the 2010–11 season. Chacarita Juniors and Atlético Tucumán were relegated at the end of the 2009–10 season. They were replaced by Olimpo and Quilmes, both of whom were promoted from the Primera B Nacional. Rosario Central and Gimnasia y Esgrima (LP) played in the relegation/promotion playoffs against All Boys and Atlético de Rafaela, respectively, to determine the other two teams for this season. Following those matches, Gimnasia stayed in the Primera División, while Rosario Central was relegated and replaced by All Boys.

During the season, Estudiantes used Estadio Centenario Dr. José Luis Meiszner in Quilmes and Estadio Ciudad de La Plata in La Plata since their home stadium, Estadio Jorge Luis Hirschi, was undergoing renovations.

Transfers
See List of Argentine Primera División transfers July–August 2010.

Managerial changes

Torneo Apertura
The Torneo Apertura 2010 (known as the Torneo IVECO del Bicentenario Apertura 2010 for sponsorship reasons) was the first championship of the season. It began on August 6 and it ended on February 6, 2011.

Standings

Results

Top goalscorers

Source:

Torneo Clausura
The Torneo Clausura 2011, officially called the Torneo Clausura Néstor Kirchner 2011, began on February 11 and ended on June 19.

Standings

Results

Top goalscorers
Source:

Relegation
Source:

Playoff for relegation/promotion playoff 1
Since Huracán and Gimnasia (La Plata) finished with the same relegation co-efficient at the dividing line, a one-match playoff was held to determine who had to play in the relegation/promotion playoffs and who had to be directly relegated to the Primera B Nacional. The match was played on June 22, 2011 at Estadio Alberto J. Armando in Buenos Aires. Gimnasia won the match 2–0 and continued to the relegation/promotion playoff against San Martín de San Juan; Huracán was relegated to the Primera B Nacional.

Relegation/promotion playoffs
The 17th and 18th placed teams in the relegation table (River Plate and Gimnasia y Esgrima (LP), respectively) played the 3rd and 4th-place finishers of the 2010–11 Primera B Nacional season (San Martín (SJ) and Belgrano, respectively), the winner of each claiming a spot in the following Primera División season. The Primera División team (Team 1) played the second leg at home. Both San Martín de San Juan and Belgrano defeated their Primera División counterparts—Gimnasia de La Plata and River Plate, respectively—to successfully earn promotion to the Primera División for the 2011–12 season. Of historic note, this is the first time River Plate got relegated to the Primera B Nacional.

|-
!colspan="5"|Relegation/promotion playoff 1

!colspan="5"|Relegation/promotion playoff 2

International qualification

Copa Libertadores
The 2010 Clausura champion (Argentinos Juniors) and the 2010 Apertura champion (Estudiantes de La Plata) earned a berth to the 2011 Copa Libertadores. Independiente won the 2010 Copa Sudamericana and earned a berth into the competition. The remaining two berths were determined by an aggregate table of the 2010 Clausura and 2010 Apertura tournaments.

Copa Sudamericana
Qualification for the 2011 Copa Sudamericana was determined by an aggregate table of the Apertura 2010 and Clausura 2011 tournaments.

See also
2010–11 in Argentine football

Notes

References

External links
Official website of the Argentine Football Association 
Season regulations 
Universofutbol.com Clausura 2010 

1
Argentine Primera División seasons